Baudartius College is a Dutch Protestant secondary school in Zutphen, named after the theologian Willem Baudartius. It will be phased out from year 2019–2020, and all new students will go to a new school called "Het Eligant"

External links 
 Official website (in Dutch)

Christian schools in the Netherlands
Secondary schools in the Netherlands
Protestantism in the Netherlands
Education in Gelderland
Zutphen